Cataprosopus monstrosus is a species of snout moth in the genus Cataprosopus. It was described by Arthur Gardiner Butler in 1881 and is known from Japan, China and Korea.

The wingspan is 30–38 mm.

References

Moths described in 1881
Megarthridiini
Moths of Japan